The Democratic Union of Senegalese Workers (UDTS) is a trade union in Senegal. It is affiliated with the International Trade Union Confederation.

About 
The UDTS is a large independent union. According to the United States Embassy, it has  approximately 6,000 workers in the fields of transportation, security, and fisheries/canning industries.

References

Trade unions in Senegal
International Trade Union Confederation